Giant Step/De Ole Folks at Home is the third studio album by American blues artist Taj Mahal. A double album, the first disc (Giant Step) is electric, while the second (De Ole Folks at Home) is acoustic. Esquire included the album at number 27 on its list of "The 75 Albums Every Man Should Own".

Track listing

Giant Step
 "Ain't Gwine Whistle Dixie No More" (Taj Mahal, Jesse Ed Davis, Gary Gilmore, Chuck Blackwell)
 "Take a Giant Step" (Carole King, Gerry Goffin)
 "Give Your Woman What She Wants" (Taj Mahal, Joel Hirschhorn)
 "Good Morning Little Schoolgirl" (Don Level, Bob Love)
 "You're Gonna Need Somebody on Your Bond" (Blind Willie Johnson)
 "Six Days on the Road" (Carl Montgomery, Earl Green)
 "Farther on Down the Road (You Will Accompany Me)" (Taj Mahal, Jesse Ed Davis, Gary Gilmore, Chuck Blackwell)
 "Keep Your Hands Off Her" (Huddie Ledbetter)
 "Bacon Fat" (Robbie Robertson, Garth Hudson)

De Ole Folks at Home
 "Linin' Track" (Huddie Ledbetter)
 "Country Blues No. 1" (Traditional; arranged by Taj Mahal)
 "Wild Ox Moan" (Vera Hall, Ruby Pickens Tartt)
 "Light Rain Blues" (Taj Mahal)
 "Little Soulful Tune" (Taj Mahal)
 "Candy Man" (Rev. Gary Davis)
 "Cluck Old Hen" (Traditional; arranged by Taj Mahal)
 "Colored Aristocracy" (Traditional; arranged by Taj Mahal)
 "Blind Boy Rag" (Taj Mahal)
 "Stagger Lee" (Harold Logan, Lloyd Price)
 "Cajun Tune" (Taj Mahal)
 "Fishin' Blues" (Henry Thomas, Taj Mahal)
 "Annie's Lover" (Traditional; arranged by Taj Mahal)

Personnel
Giant Step
Taj Mahal - vocals, harmonica, banjo, Mississippi national steel-bodied guitar
Jesse Ed Davis - electric guitar, acoustic guitar, piano, organ
Gary Gilmore - electric bass
Chuck "Brother" Blackwell - drums
De Ole Folks at Home
Taj Mahal - vocals, harmonica, guitar, banjo
Technical
Brian Ross-Myring, Chris Hinshaw, Jerry Hochman - engineer
Virginia Team - cover design
Jesse Ed Davis - typography/hand lettering

References

1969 albums
Taj Mahal (musician) albums
Albums produced by Dave Rubinson
Columbia Records albums